The Kingsmen Quartet (better known as The Kingsmen) is an American Southern gospel vocal quartet.

Musical career and Awards 

The Kingsmen are a Southern Gospel vocal quartet based out of Asheville, North Carolina. Many singers of Southern Gospel including Jim Hamill, Squire Parsons, Anthony Burger, Mark Trammell, and others have been members of The Kingsmen.
The group was most well known in the 1970s, 1980s, and 1990s for their live concert recordings and band.

GMA Dove Awards
 Album of the Year – Big and Live (1974)
 Album of the Year – Chattanooga Live (1978)
 Southern Gospel Album of the Year – From Out of the Past (1980)

Singing News Fan Awards
 Favorite Group (1980, 1985)
 Favorite Traditional Male Quartet (1981)
 Favorite Horizon Group (2002, as Carolina Boys)
 Favorite Lead: Jim Hamill (1974, 1975, 1981, 1982, 1983, 1985)
 Favorite Male Singer: Jim Hamill (1981, 1984, 1985)
 Favorite Tenor: Johnny Parrack (1976), Ernie Phillips (1980, 1981)
 Favorite Bass: Ray Dean Reese (1979, 1985)
 Favorite Baritone: Wayne Maynard (1981), Parker Jonathan (1992, 1993)
 Favorite Band (1978, 1981 to 1984, 1986 to 1997)
 Favorite Musician: Anthony Burger (1980 to 1989)
 Favorite Musician (non-pianist):  Tim Surrett (2004, 2005)
 Favorite Horizon Individual: Bryan Hutson (1997)
 Song of the Year: "Sweet Beulah Land" (1981), "Wish You Were Here" (1992)
 Album of the Year:  Wish You Were Here (1992)

Other
 BMI Radio Airplay Award, “Oh Yes I Am” (2016)
 BMI Radio Airplay Award, “Battle Cry” (2017)
 Gospel Music Hall of Fame (Inducted in 2000)
 Christian Music Hall of Fame (inducted in 2007)
 Southern Gospel Hall of Fame 
 Eldridge Fox, inducted in 1998
 Jim Hamill, inducted in 2004
 Anthony Burger, inducted in 2007
 Ray Dean Reese, inducted in 2008
 Squire Parsons, inducted in 2008
 Mark Trammell, inducted in 2018
 Ernie Phillips, inducted in 2019
 Arthur Rice, inducted in 2022

Line-ups

Discography 

 

 1956 Single: If Everybody Prays/This World’s Gonna Bow to the King of Kings
 1959 EP: House of Gold/Till I Found God/New Jerusalem/This is a Mean World
 1960 What Love
 1961 New Jerusalem
 1962 Closer to Thee
 1963 That Kingsmen Sound
 1964 From the Land of the Sky
 1965 A Visit with the Kingsmen
 1966 Carolina's Favorite Quartet
 1966 Songs and Spirituals
 1967 Sing Out!
 1968 Kingsmen Kountry
 1968 Daddy Sang Bass
 1968 Crown Him King
 1969 Try a Little Kindness
 1969 Standing Room Only
 1970 The Kingsmen
 1971 Then and Now
 1971 Suddenly There's a Valley
 1971 America's Favorite Hymns
 1971 Presented by Colonial Mobile Homes
 1972 May Day
 1972 Turn Your Radio On
 1972 It's Time to Ring the Bell
 1972 Johnny Parrack Out Front
 1972 Hymn Time in the Country
 1973 High and Low: Johnny Parrack and Ray Dean Reese
 1973 Sing a Lot of Gospel
 1973 Reverend Everett Beverly and Anna Laura
 1973 Just Plain Singin'''
 1973 Just As the Sun Went Down (same album as above) 1973 Big and Live 1974 1686 lbs. of Gospel 1975 Jubiliation 1975 The Old and the New: Jim Hamill and Squire Parsons 1975 24 Carat Gospel 1976 It Made News In Heaven 1976 Just In Time 1976 Golden Gospel 1977 Just a Little Closer Home 1977 Chattanooga Live 1978 The Upper Window 1979 From Out of the Past 1980 Ring the Bells of Freedom 1981 Live...Naturally 1982 Your Ride Is on the Way 1982 With Grady Nutt 1983 Live from the University of Alabama 1984 Kingsmen Silver (compilation album with two original featuring Garry Sheppard)
 1984 The Game of Life 1985 Better in Person 1986 Stand Up at Opryland USA 1987 Mississippi Live 1988 Anchors Aweigh 1989 The Judgement 1990 Live in Dayton 1991 Wish You Were Here 1992 Singin' in the Sun Live 1992 Walking with Jesus 1992 Singing News Hits 1992 Living by Faith 1993 Kingsmen Band 1993 27 Great Gospel Songs 1993 New Life 1994 Ridin' High 1994 Live from the Alabama Theatre 1994 A Kingsmen Christmas 1994 30 Great Gospel Songs 1995 Georgia Live 1996 40th Anniversary Reunion: Perfecting the Crown 1996 Beyond the Clouds 1997 You're Not Alone 1997 Southern Classics Volume 1 1997 Kingsmen Standards Volume 1 1998 The Old Time Way 1998 Kingsmen Standards Volume 2 1999 Southern Classics Volume 2 1999 Shelter 1999 Not Quite as Big, But Just as Live 2000 Proven Time and Again 2001 I Will 2001 Honoring the Heritage 1 (as Carolina Boys)
 2002 Good News! (as Carolina Boys)
 2003 Ready (as Carolina Boys)
 2004 Born Again 2005 My Past Is Past 2006 Good, Good God 2007 I'll Not Turn Back-Live 2007 Honoring the Heritage 2 - Live
 2008 When God Ran 2009 Missing People 2010 Honoring the Heritage 3 2010 Live Performances from the National Quartet Convention 2011 Grace Says 2012 Once Again 2013 Front Row Live 2014 Battle Cry 2016 Classic Live Performances 2017 They Don't Know 2019 Victory Shout 2020 40th Anniversary Reunion: Live, Extended, Remixed, Remastered 2021 More to the Story  2022 ‘Tis the Reason  2023 Decades, Volumes 1 & 2''

External links and references 

 The Official Kingsmen Quartet web site
 Southern Gospel Music history: Kingsmen Quartet
 Illustrated discography

References

Musical groups established in 1956
American Christian musical groups
Musical groups from Asheville, North Carolina
Southern gospel performers
Crossroads Music
American gospel musical groups
Vocal quartets
Gospel quartets
1956 establishments in North Carolina